Sinomonas humi is a Gram-positive and non-motile bacterium from the genus Sinomonas which has been isolated from mangrove forest soil from the Tanjung Lumpur forest in Malaysia.

References

Bacteria described in 2015
Micrococcaceae